The 1st Georgia Sharpshooter Battalion was a sharpshooter unit of the Confederate States Army during the American Civil War. It was authorized by an act in April 1862 by the Confederate Congress, and was formed in Savannah, Georgia. The 1st Battalion Sharpshooters served at Fort McAllister defending the coast of Georgia in the Battle of Fort McAllister (1863). They also saw action at the Battle of Jackson, Mississippi as well as the Battle of Chickamauga, and the Chattanooga Campaign. The battalion fought to the end of the war, their last engagement being at the Battle of Bentonville in March 1865.

History and lineage

On June 1, 1862, Major Robert H. Anderson, who graduated from the US Military Academy at West Point in 1857, was serving as inspector general at the headquarters of the Department of South Carolina and Georgia in Charleston, SC. On that day he wrote a letter to Major General John C. Pemberton, the department commander. In his letter he asked the general to raise a battalion of four companies of sharpshooters; the men to be recruited from the regiments in the brigade of Brigadier General William Duncan Smith which was stationed in Savannah, Georgia. Pemberton gave his approval and Anderson began recruiting in the city. On June 20, Pemberton wrote to Adjutant and Inspector General Samuel Cooper in Richmond, VA nominating Anderson to be in command of the 1st Georgia Sharpshooter Battalion.

Coastal Defense

The battalion was formed by early August, and on the 21st marched from Camp Pemberton to Camp Anderson, named for the battalion's commander, located on Wildhorn Plantation, about 12 miles from Savannah. Assigned to guarding strategic Fort McAllister in 1861, they helped repulse seven US Naval engagements to capture Fort McAllister, which protected Savannah. By lining the riverbank with sharpshooters, the defenders rained projectiles on the Union ironclads, forcing them to withdraw, and winning the praise of Confederate generals and congressmen alike. Anderson was promoted to command the 5th Georgia Cavalry, with Major Arthur Shaaf given formal command of the battalion in April 1863. On 5 May, they were ordered to Mississippi as part of General William H. T. Walker's brigade. The brigade moved to join the army being formed under General Joseph E. Johnston for the Battle of Vicksburg.

Battle of Atlanta
The Sharpshooters stayed with the Army of Tennessee throughout the remainder of the conflict, seeing action in Chattanooga, Dalton, and Kennesaw Mountain. On June 27th Walker's Division, including the Georgian sharpshooters, was posted at the base of the mountain; at a place called 'the dead angle' where some of the fiercest fighting took place. For the next month, they resisted Union advances on Atlanta, and on July 20th they moved north along Peachtree Road, striking a Federal division south of Peachtree Creek. After being repulsed, Walker's division along with Hardee's Corps marched six miles south of the city, taking up position along the left flank of General McPherson's Union troops between Atlanta and Decatur.

On August 19th, the 1st Battalion Georgia Sharpshooters marched with Hardee from Atlanta to East Point in an attempt to protect Atlanta's last rail connection. On August 30th, they moved toward Jonesborough.

Later service
On August 31, the 1st Sharpshooter Battalion was heavily engaged in what proved to be the final loss of Atlanta and the near destruction of the Army of Tennessee. Of the remaining members of the battalion, fifty percent were either killed, wounded or captured in the Battle of Jonesborough. Hardee's defeat allowed Hood to evacuate Atlanta, clearing Sherman's path to the sea.  The battered unit wandered throughout Alabama in the fall, with the end coming in December at Franklin and Nashville. They moved throughout Tennessee and North Carolina, fighting at Bentonville before surrendering to General William T. Sherman on April 25th, 1865 16 days after Appomattox.

See also
List of Georgia Confederate Civil War regiments

Notes

References
Brown, Russell K, Our Connection with Savannah, A History of the 1st Battalion Georgia Sharpshooters, Mercer University Press, 2004, 
Durham, Roger S., Guardian of Savannah - Fort McAllister, Georgia, in the Civil War and Beyond, The University of South Carolina Press, 2008, 
Christman, William E., UNDAUNTED: The History of Fort McAllister, Georgia, Darien Printing & Graphics, 1996, Library of Congress Catalog 96-77666 ASIN:
Smith, Derek, Civil War Savannah, Frederic C. Beil, 1997, 

Units and formations of the Confederate States Army from Georgia (U.S. state)
Sharpshooter units and formations of the American Civil War